Profile in Anger is a 1984 Hong Kong action film produced by Raymond Chow and Leonard Ho, written, action choreographed, directed by and starring Bryan Leung. This film is Leung's directorial debut and is also the first film Leung starred in that is set in modern day.

Plot
Leung Chun-yue (Bryan Leung) is a famous architect who is about to marry his girlfriend, Hydi (Pat Ha). He is, by chance, reunited with Wong Kin-hang (Damian Lau), a long lost friend whom Leung invites to be his house as a guest. Wong is now in Hong Kong with the aim to kill jewel king, Wai Kit (Chang Yi), who has ruined his family. Wong fails in his attempt but is captured and tortured by Wai. Wong warns Wai all evidence against him is being kept by a friend. Mistaking Leung to be the friend, Wai send two killers, Honey (Philip Ko) and  Man (Michael Chan), to get Leung. Man kills Hydi but Leung manages to escape. Leung has just read Wong's diary and know everything about Wong. Now Leung decides to take law into his own hands in order to challenges Wai and his gang.

Cast
Bryan Leung as Leung Chun-yue
Philip Ko as Honey
Michael Chan as Man
Damian Lau as Wong Kin-hang
Chang Yi as Wai Kit
Pat Ha as Hydi Lam
Mabel Kwong as Honey's girlfriend
Tong Kam-tong as Wai Kit's henchman
Tai San as Tarzan
Law Keung as Keung
Leung Hak-shun as Doctor
Homer Cheung as Rascal teasing Hydi
Hon Kong as Chang
Ronnie as Priest
Lee Chun-wah as Wai Kit's thug
Wong Siu-ming as Tarzan's thug

External links

Profile In Anger at Hong Kong Cinemagic

1984 films
1984 action thriller films
1984 martial arts films
Hong Kong action thriller films
Hong Kong martial arts films
Kung fu films
1980s Cantonese-language films
Golden Harvest films
Films set in Hong Kong
Films shot in Hong Kong
1984 directorial debut films
1980s Hong Kong films